The Bahamas competed at the 2011 World Championships in Athletics from August 27 to September 4 in Daegu, South Korea.

Team selection

The Bahamas Association of Athletic Associations announced a team of 18
athletes based upon a mixture of experience and youth to compete at the championships.  The team will be led by former World 200m champion and Olympic bronze
medalist Debbie Ferguson-McKenzie, former World High Jump champion 
Donald Thomas, and Triple Jump Olympic bronze
medalist Leevan Sands.

The following athletes appeared on the preliminary Entry List, but not on the Official Start List of the specific event, resulting in total number of 17 competitors:

Medalists
The following Bahamian competitor won a medal at the Championships

Results

Men

Women

References

External links
Official local organising committee website
Official IAAF competition website

Nations at the 2011 World Championships in Athletics
2011
World Championships in Athletics